Women Talking is a 2022 American drama film written and directed by Sarah Polley. It is based on the 2018 novel of the same name by Miriam Toews, and inspired by real-life events that occurred at the Manitoba Colony in Bolivia. The film stars Rooney Mara, Claire Foy, Jessie Buckley, Judith Ivey, Ben Whishaw, and Frances McDormand, who is also a producer on the film.

Women Talking had its world premiere at the 49th Telluride Film Festival on September 2, 2022, and was released in select cinemas in the United States on December 23, 2022, before a wide release on January 20, 2023, by United Artists Releasing. The film received acclaim from critics, who praised Polley's screenplay and direction, the performances of the cast (particularly Foy, Buckley, and Whishaw) and score. It was also named one of the top ten films of 2022 by the National Board of Review and the American Film Institute.

Polley received the Telluride Film Festival Silver Medallion tribute award. Composer Hildur Guðnadóttir received a tribute award at the 2022 Toronto International Film Festival. At the 95th Academy Awards the film was nominated for Best Picture and Polley won the award for Best Adapted Screenplay. It was also nominated for Best Screenplay and Best Original Score at the 80th Golden Globe Awards, Best Ensemble Cast of a Motion Picture at the 29th Screen Actors Guild Awards, and received 6 nominations at the 28th Critics' Choice Awards, including Best Picture.

Accolades

References

External links 
 

Women Talking